Crowley Broadcast Analysis is an official institution of research, which monitors the radios in Brazil since 1997. Currently the company provides data to the Escritório Central de Arrecadação e Distribuição (ECAD)  and the Brazilian Association of Record Producers (ABPD) and besides being the standard for the Phonographic Industry in the country. In August 2009, also exclusively provides the charts for Billboard Brasil that is based on grid-base radios with 250 stations surveyed in 10 cities.

Charts 
In 2018, the company launches the Crowley Charts website, which compiles tables that were published weekly by Billboard Brasil. The site offers the Top 100 Brasil, with the 100 most played songs of the week, and tables with the 10 most played songs by genre (National Pop, International Pop, National Pop/Rock, Pagode, Sertanejo, Forró, Funk/Black Music, Gospel and Latin).

References

External links
 Official site
 Top 20 Weeakly

Radio in Brazil
Radio organisations in Brazil